Van Winkle House, is located in Franklin Lakes, Bergen County, New Jersey, United States. The home was added to the National Register of Historic Places on July 24, 1984.

See also
National Register of Historic Places listings in Bergen County, New Jersey

External links
 Google Street View of Van Winkle House

References

Franklin Lakes, New Jersey
Houses on the National Register of Historic Places in New Jersey
Houses in Bergen County, New Jersey
National Register of Historic Places in Bergen County, New Jersey
New Jersey Register of Historic Places